Dubliany may refer to

 Dubliany, Lviv Raion, Lviv Oblast, town in Ukraine
 Dubliany, Sambir Raion, Lviv Oblast, urban-type settlement in Ukraine
 Dubliany, Rivne Oblast, village in Ukraine